Songs for You, Truths for Me is the second album by English singer, songwriter and guitarist James Morrison, released on 26 September 2008. The album was a commercial success in the UK where it entered the album charts at number three and in Ireland where it topped the charts. It has been certified double Platinum by the BPI with over 700,000 sales and has sold more than 1 million of copies worldwide.

Album information
On 29 September 2008, Morrison's second album entitled Songs for You, Truths for Me was released. In the writing process for this album he worked with  Dan Wilson, Ryan Tedder, Martin Terefe, Martin Brammer, Chris Braide and Steve Robson. The album also features a duet with Nelly Furtado entitled "Broken Strings", co-written with Fraser T Smith and Nina Woodford.  From October 2008 until the end of the year Morrison has toured throughout Europe. When talking about the album at 4Music Presents, Morrison stated that the music had 'moved on' a lot from the first album but that not to the point where fans of his previous album wouldn't be able to 'get it'.

The album was re-released on 16 November 2009, featuring two brand new tracks: "On the Same Side" and "Get to You" (which was  the first single of the re-issue of the album and was released on the same day) and a second disc, The Basement Sessions, with acoustic versions of six of his own songs and a Michael Jackson cover "Man in the Mirror".

Chart performance
Songs for You, Truths for Me was released on the 12 September 2008. The album entered the UK Album Chart at number three, being held off the top two spots by new albums from the Kings Of Leon and Will Young. The album was not a huge success initially and dropped out of the top ten after three weeks. The album made a gradual descent down the chart until the release of the second single of the album, "Broken Strings". Following the success of the single, the album steadily rose back up the charts before jumping from number twenty-four back into the top ten, reaching number seven. The album then went to number four and has been certified Platinum by the BPI with over 300,000 sales.

The album was a commercial success in Ireland as well. It entered the Irish Album Chart at number fourteen before dropping off the chart completely after a couple of weeks. Then, following the success of "Broken Strings" the album re-entered the chart at number seventy-three and rose through the charts until it leaped from number fourteen to number one, giving Songs for You, Truths for Me its first number one chart placing where it stayed for one week.

The album came back to the Top 10 Albums on the UK Albums Chart, as of 30 August, which gave the album big sales again, eventually selling over 750,000 copies in UK alone.

Track listing

Original release

Deluxe edition CD+DVD
A deluxe edition of the album was released with an additional DVD on 24 November 2008.

2-disc deluxe edition
Another deluxe edition of the album was released on 16 November 2009, with two new songs on disc one, and a seven track disc with acoustic versions of Morrison songs, and a Michael Jackson cover version.

Personnel
Main personnel
James Morrison – vocals
Eg White – guitar, bass, drums, keyboards, backing vocals, production on "Dream on Hayley"
Steve Robson – bass, drums, piano, keyboards, percussion, glockenspiel, melodica, production on "Save Yourself", "If You Don't Wanna Love Me", "Fix the World Up for You" and "Love Is Hard"
John Shanks – bass, guitar, keyboards, production on "Precious Love"
Martin Terefe – bass, guitar, organ, production on "The Only Night" and "Once When I Was Little"
Alex Smith – bass, guitar, percussion, engineering
Jeff Rothschild – drums, engineering, mixing
Mark Taylor – percussion, keyboards, string arrangements, programming, production on "You Make It Real", "Broken Strings" and "Nothing Ever Hurt Like You", engineering
Ryan Tedder – piano, guitar, production on "Please Don't Stop the Rain"
Nelly Furtado – vocals on "Broken Strings"
Ai – vocals on "Broken Strings" (featuring Ai)

Additional guitars
Seton Daunt
Adam Phillips
Additional bass
Paul Barry
Arnulf Linder
Jeremy McCoy
Dan Wilson
Additional drums
Karl Brazil
Eddie Fisher
Ash Soan
Kristoffer Sonne
Additional keyboards
Charles Judge
Nikolaj Torp
Additional pianos
Nikolaj Torp
Dan Wilson
Hammond organ
Nikolaj Torp
Additional backing vocals
Donovan Blackwood
Ayak Thiik
Julia Waters
Maxine Waters
Rita Ora

String section
Arrangements
Mark Taylor
David Davidson
Strings
David Angell
The London Session Orchestra
Violins
David Davidson
Ghislaine Fleischmann
Emma Kummrow
Perry Mason
Luigi Mazzocchi
Charles Parker
Emlyn Singleton
Igor Szwec
Gregory Teperman
Violas
Monisa Angell
Ruth Frazier
Bruce White
Kristin Wilkinson
Cellos
John Catchings
David Jack Daniels
Arnulf Linder
Jennie Lorenzo

Horn section
Saxophones
Chris Farr
José Luís Hernández
Andy Ross
Trumpets
Alexander Abreu
Dominic Glover
Mike A. Jarosz
John Thirkell
Trombones
Mat Colman
Amaury Perez
J. Neil Sidwell

Production personnel
Additional engineering
Baeho Bobby Shin
Richard Flack
Dyre Gormsen
Rob Haggett
Colin Heldt
Iain Hill
Ren Swan
Neil Tucker
Richard Woodcraft
Engineering assistance
Helen Atkinson
Additional mixing
Tom Elmhirst
Ash Howes
Digital editing
Lars Fox
Rob Haggett

Additional personnel
Everton Nelson – orchestra leader
Lee Strickland – photography

Charts

Weekly charts

Year-end charts

Certifications

Release history

References

External links
 
 Download James Morrison - Songs For You, Truths For Me(2010)

2008 albums
James Morrison (singer) albums
Albums produced by John Shanks
Albums produced by Ryan Tedder
Albums produced by Mark Taylor (music producer)